Vizurești may refer to several villages in Romania:

 Vizurești, a village in Ciocănești Commune, Dâmbovița County
 Vizurești, a village in Buciumeni Commune, Galați County